Lumpe is a surname of German origin. Notable people with the surname include:

 Eduard Lumpe (1813–1876), Austrian obstetrician
 Jerry Lumpe (1933-2014), American professional baseball player and coach
 Sheila Lumpe (1935-2014), American politician

See also

Surnames of German origin